After Forever may refer to:
 After Forever, Dutch symphonic metal band
 After Forever (album), 2007 album of the namesake band
 After Forever (song), 1971 rock song by English band Black Sabbath
 After Ever Happy, 2022 American film, released as After Forever in some countries